The 2022 Long Beach mayoral election was held on June 7, 2022. Because no candidate reached 50% of the vote, there was a runoff election on November 8, 2022. Although incumbent Mayor Robert Garcia was eligible to run for a third term, he opted to run for the U.S. House instead (and won that seat). Rex Richardson was elected mayor, defeating Suzie Price.

Candidates 
Melanie Becerril (write-in)
Raul Cedillo, substitute teacher
Deborah Mozer, commercial finance professional
Suzie Price, Long Beach City Councilwoman
Rex Richardson, Long Beach City Councilman and vice mayor
Joshua Rodriguez, police officer
Franklin Sims

Endorsements

Results

Primary election

Runoff

References 

Long Beach
Mayoral elections in Long Beach, California
Long Beach